Gumlog is an unincorporated lakeside community and census-designated place in Franklin County, Georgia, United States. The population was 2,146 at the 2010 census.

Geography
Gumlog is located in the northeast corner of Franklin County at primary coordinate point  (34.504556, -83.104556). It consists of extensive residential neighborhoods along the shores of Lake Hartwell on the Savannah River. The northeast border of the CDP is the centerline of the main stem of the lake, which also forms the state line with South Carolina. To the northwest, the CDP is bordered by Stephens County, and to the southeast it is bordered by Hart County. The southern edge of the CDP follows Interstate 85, and the southwest corner of the CDP borders the city of Lavonia. Access from I-85 is from Exit 173 (Georgia Highway 17) in Lavonia.

Tugaloo State Park occupies a peninsula on Lake Hartwell in the eastern part of the CDP.

Georgia Highway 328, known locally as Gumlog Road, is nearly the only way in and out of the community of Gumlog. Gumlog Road runs from Highway 59 in Lavonia to a junction with Highway 17 in Avalon. Gumlog Creek also starts near the same junction in Avalon. Avalon was going to be named "Gumlog" after Gumlog Creek, but when the charter came back from the State Legislature, the name had been changed instead to Avalon.

Demographics

As of the census of 2000, there were 2,025 people, 849 households, and 625 families residing in the CDP. The racial makeup of the community was 92.69% White, 4.40% African American, 0.94% Native American, 1.14% from other races, and 0.84% from two or more races. Hispanic or Latino of any race were 1.53% of the population.

There were 849 households, out of which 26.1% had children under the age of 18 living with them, 61.6% were married couples living together, 7.8% had a female householder with no husband present, and 26.3% were non-families. 23.0% of all households were made up of individuals, and 9.7% had someone living alone who was 65 years of age or older.  The average household size was 2.39 and the average family size was 2.78.

In the CDP, the population was spread out, with 20.2% under the age of 18, 6.7% from 18 to 24, 25.9% from 25 to 44, 30.4% from 45 to 64, and 16.7% who were 65 years of age or older.  The median age was 43 years. For every 100 females, there were 97.9 males.  For every 100 females age 18 and over, there were 98.9 males.

The median income for a household in the CDP was $39,609, and the median income for a family was $42,813. Males had a median income of $29,405 versus $25,139 for females. The per capita income for the CDP was $20,859.  About 6.0% of families and 6.9% of the population were below the poverty line, including 6.5% of those under age 18 and 5.2% of those age 65 or over.

Historical notes

First court in Franklin County
In 1785, the Yazoo land fraud caused the state of Georgia to surrender its claim on what is now Alabama and Mississippi. South Carolina took advantage of the situation to move the boundary with Georgia from the main branch of the Keowee River to the Tugaloo branch, absorbing some Franklin County territory. Like other Georgia counties at the time, Franklin County had to decide which land claims were legitimate and which were fraudulent. The first county court was held at the home of Warren Philpot on Gumlog Creek. George Walton, a signer of the Declaration of Independence, was the court's chief justice. The assistant justices were Jesse Walton, Benjamin Cleveland, Larkin Cleveland, and John Gorham.

Attractions
Tugaloo State Park
Lake Hartwell
I-85 Welcome Center

References

Census-designated places in Franklin County, Georgia
Census-designated places in Georgia (U.S. state)